Daniel Legras (born 28 December 1957) is a French sprint canoeist.

Career
Legras competed in the mid to late 1980s. Participating in two Summer Olympics, he earned his best finish of sixth in the K-2 500 m event at Los Angeles in 1984.

References
Sports-Reference.com profile

1957 births
Canoeists at the 1984 Summer Olympics
Canoeists at the 1988 Summer Olympics
French male canoeists
Living people
Olympic canoeists of France